Koula may refer to:

Places 

 Koula, Koulikoro, Mali
 Koula, Ségou, Mali

Mountains 

 Koula Mountains, Greece

Rivers 

Kō'ula River, Kauai, Hawaii

People 

 Koula Agagiotou, a Greek actress